Footwraps (also referred to as foot cloths, rags, bandages or bindings, or by their Russian name portyanki) are rectangular pieces of cloth that are worn wrapped around the feet to avoid chafing, absorb sweat and improve the foothold. Footwraps were worn with boots before socks became widely available, and remained in use by armies in Eastern Europe until the beginning of the 21st century.

Description

Footwraps are typically square, rectangular or less often triangular. Thinner cloth may be folded to produce a square, rectangular or triangular shape after folding. Russian army footwraps were made of flannel for use in winter and of cotton for use in summer.

Apart from being cheaper and simpler to make or improvise, footwraps are also quicker to dry than socks and are more resistant to wear and tear: any holes can be compensated for by re-wrapping the cloth in a different position. Their principal drawback is that any folds in the wraps, which easily occur during marching unless the wraps are very carefully put on, can quickly cause blisters or wounds. Consequently, armies issued detailed instructions on how to put on footwraps correctly.

Footwraps are notorious for the foul smell that they develop when worn under military conditions, where soldiers are often unable to change or dry the cloths for days. Russian veterans used to jokingly pride themselves about the stench of their footwear, referring to their footwraps as "chemical weapons" that would defeat any enemy unaccustomed to the smell.

Military use

Footwraps were issued by armies and worn by soldiers throughout history, often long after civilians had replaced them with socks. Prior to the 20th century, socks or stockings were often luxury items affordable only for officers, while the rank and file had to use wraps.

Germany
Prussian soldiers wore Fußlappen,  foot cloths. An 1869 "Manual of Military Hygiene" advised: "Footwraps are appropriate in summer, but they must have no seams and be very carefully put on; clean and soft socks are better." An 1867 German dictionary of proverbs records the following saying: "One's own footwrap is better than someone else's boot."

The German Wehrmacht used footwraps until the end of World War II. They continued to be worn in the East German National People's Army until 1968.

Eastern Europe

The Russian and later Soviet armed forces issued footwraps since Peter the Great established the regular Imperial Russian Army. Footwraps remained standard issue in many post-Soviet armies. The Belarusian, Ukrainian and Georgian armies eventually abandoned them in favor of socks in the 2000s. In each case, nostalgia about the traditional footwear ran high among soldiers. The Ukrainian army held a special farewell ceremony for its footwraps, with soldiers reciting poems and fables about them.

In the Russian army, footwraps remained in use for tasks requiring the wear of heavy boots until 2013, because they were considered to offer a better fit with standard-issue boots. They were issued again during the 2022 Russian mobilization.

Because of their association with the Russian army, footwraps are called chaussettes russes ("Russian socks") in French.

See also
Puttee
Bast shoe, with which they can be worn

References

Socks
Footwear
Undergarments